Cirrhochrista arcusalis is a moth in the family Crambidae. It is found in Australia, where it has been recorded from coastal Queensland and New South Wales.

References

Spilomelinae
Moths described in 1859
Moths of Australia